Polistodon is an extinct genus of tritylodonts from the Bajocian or Callovian (Middle Jurassic) of China. It contains one species, P. chuannanensis, which is known from a single skull from the Xiashaximiao Formation. According to one study, it may be a species of the genus Stereognathus.

References

Tritylodontids
Prehistoric cynodont genera
Bajocian genera
Callovian genera
Middle Jurassic synapsids of Asia
Jurassic China
Fossils of China
Fossil taxa described in 1984